Richard Merillat is an entrepreneur, philanthropist and the retired President/CEO of Merillat Industries.

Born in Adrian, Michigan, his parents were Ruth and Orville D. Merillat, founder of Merillat Industries, Inc., which was acquired by the Masco Corporation in 1985.

He worked in the family business from when he was 13 until retirement, eventually becoming vice president of manufacturing and president of Merillat Industries, and continuing as chairman of the board.

He is a long-time Mackinac Center for Public Policy supporter and is the president of Christian Family Foundation in Naples, Florida. He has also been associated with the Lenawee Christian School, the Christian Family Centre, Huntington University, Bill Glass Prison Ministries, and the American Bible Society 

Richard Merillat and his wife Lynette are well-known philanthropists in both Florida and Michigan. They are both involved in society. They maintain homes in both states which were designed by the late Robert Denning of Denning & Fourcade of New York City and Paris. They have three daughters: Wendy, Collette and Tricia.
 
The Merillat Quarter Horse Farm was widely renowned with AQHA World Champions at Stud. It was donated to Michigan State University in 1996, the largest gift-in-kind received by the university and by the College of Agriculture and Natural Resources. This included , two premier stallions, 43 quarterhorses, two houses (each  in size), a 72-by-200 horse barn, a 72-by-100 breeding barn, an 80-by-200 arena, and storage building.

The Merillats created the Merillat Scholars Program at Huntington University in Huntington, Indiana, a program providing financial assistance to students there who are members of the Church of the United Brethren in Christ, student leaders of Youth for Christ, or children of Huntington alumni. He is also on the Board of Trustees of Eckerd College in St. Petersburg, Florida.  The college awarded him an honorary Doctor of Commercial Science degree. in 2002.

References

Year of birth missing (living people)
Living people
American manufacturing businesspeople
American philanthropists
American socialites
People from Florida
People from Adrian, Michigan
Place of birth missing (living people)
Eckerd College trustees